The following highways are numbered 207:

Canada
 Manitoba Provincial Road 207
 Nova Scotia Route 207
 Prince Edward Island Route 207
 Quebec Route 207

China
 China National Highway 207

Costa Rica
 National Route 207

Japan
 Route 207 (Japan)

United States
 Alabama State Route 207
 California State Route 207
 Connecticut Route 207
 Florida State Road 207
 Georgia State Route 207 (former)
 Iowa Highway 207 (former)
 Kentucky Route 207
 Maine State Route 207
 Montana Secondary Highway 207
 Nevada State Route 207
 New Mexico State Road 207
 New York State Route 207
 North Carolina Highway 207
 Ohio State Route 207
 Oregon Route 207
 South Carolina Highway 207
 Tennessee State Route 207
 Texas State Highway 207
 Texas State Highway Loop 207
 Utah State Route 207 (former)
 Vermont Route 207
 Virginia State Route 207
 Washington State Route 207